Ewell is an unincorporated community in Dale County, Alabama, United States.

History
Ewell is named in honor of the son of the community's first postmaster. A post office operated under the name Ewell from 1891 to 1905.

References

Unincorporated communities in Dale County, Alabama
Unincorporated communities in Alabama